Tafresh and Ashtian (electoral district) is an electoral district  in the Markazi Province. This electoral district elects 1 member of parliament.

References

Electoral districts of Iran
Markazi Province